Browns Flat is a Canadian rural community in Kings County, New Brunswick.

Located within Greenwich Parish, Browns Flat is situated along a stretch of the Long Reach section of the Saint John River and is accessed by Route 102.  From Moncton/Sussex, Browns Flat can allow be accessed via Route 124 from Norton.  The Evandale Ferry runs 24 hours a day by the Department of Transportation at no fee to the user.

Browns Flat is home to:

Greenwich Volunteer Fire Department. Founded 1974.
Greenwich Recreation Center.
The Rite Touch Convenience. 
Donald's Excavation Service.
Balemans Fruits and Vegetable Stand.
Beulah Camp, a campground belonging to the Atlantic District of the Wesleyan Church.
Catons Island, an island located in the Saint John River. It holds week-long summer camps for families (long weekend in August), kids and teenagers.  It is owned by the Atlantic District of the Wesleyan Church.
3034 Blue Mountain Rangers Royal Canadian Army Cadet Corps.
Blue Mountain Sports.
Browns Flat Baptist Church.
Wesley United Church.
Galbraith Stables.
Royal Canadian Legion Branch #87 Greenwich
Jones Creek Hall.

The nearest large community is the town of Grand Bay-Westfield, New Brunswick which is approximately a 10–15 minutes drive from Browns Flat.

History

Notable people

See also
List of communities in New Brunswick

References

Communities in Kings County, New Brunswick